Razorwyre is a speed/power metal band from Wellington, New Zealand. Formed in 2009 under the name Gaywyre, they released an EP entitled "Coming Out" under that name before changing their name to Razorwyre in 2010. The "Coming Out" EP was re-released on cassette in 2011 by Infernö Records, limited to 100 copies. That release led to a deal with the same label to release their debut full-length, "Another Dimension" in 2012.

They were scheduled to perform at the Keep It True XVI festival in Germany in 2013, but cancelled their performance because their drummer broke both of his arms.

Discography

Albums
 Another Dimension – (2012)

Singles/EPs
 Coming Out – EP (2009)
 Coming Out – Cassette single (2011)

Members

Current lineup
 Zane Chylde – Vocals
 James Murray – Guitar
 Chris Calavrias – Guitar
 Dave Hampton – Bass
 Nick Oakes – Drums

References

External links
 Official Razorwyre website
 Razorwyre at Encyclopaedia Metallum

Musical groups established in 2009
Musical quintets
Musical groups from Wellington